Hitting Home PAC was a 527 organization founded by Pete Buttigieg in 2017. Buttigieg launched the PAC in June 2017, several months after his failed bid for the Democratic National Committee chairmanship in its 2017 election.

Hitting Home PAC was a Carey committee, also known as a "Hybrid PAC", a type of 527 organization which is a hybrid of a super PAC and traditional PAC. The organization aimed to support the Democratic Party in the 2018 election cycle. It aimed to refocus the party to place an emphasis on the message that it would "protect and support people going about their lives." Buttigieg stated a desire for the PAC to focus on supporting heartland Democrats.

It was shut down in May 2019, amid Buttigieg's presidential campaign.

Expenditures
The PAC raised $403,503, and spent nearly all of it by the end of the 2018 election cycle. A total of $399,267 was spent by the PAC during the 2018 cycle. Before being shut down in 2019, the PAC raised an additional $5,970 and spent an additional $10,206 in the 2020 cycle.

Only 10% of the PAC's spending directly supported candidates, with a mere $37,000 given to candidates. This has led to an accusation by HuffPost that the PAC did little but spend money to boost Buttigieg's image. Of the $37,000 given directly to candidates, $36,000 was distributed among 22 different Democratic candidates for the United States House of Representatives. The sole United States Senate candidate to receive a contribution from the PAC was fellow Indiana politician, Joe Donnelly, who received $1,000.

The PAC paid $70,000 to Lis Smith, who served as Buttigieg's spokesperson and subsequently became the communications director for his presidential bid. The PAC paid $27,500 to Michael Schmuhl, who was the PAC's treasurer and subsequently became Buttigieg's presidential campaign manager. The PAC's finance director was paid $34,500. A major Democratic media consulting firm was paid $28,500.

References

Pete Buttigieg
2017 establishments in the United States
2019 disestablishments in the United States
United States political action committees